Liga Deportiva Universitaria de Quito's 2008 season is the club's 55th year in professional football, and the 47th in the top level of national football, Ecuador's Serie A.

In the domestic tournament, the club unsuccessfully defended their 2007 title, finishing as the runner-up to Deportivo Quito. The club reached a level of success in international tournaments that no other Ecuadorian club has ever achieved. LDU Quito became the first Ecuadorian club to win an international title by winning their first Copa Libertadores. The win allowed the club to participate in FIFA's annual Club World Cup, which they finished in 2nd place.

2008 marked the last season Argentine manager Edgardo Bauza will remain at the position. He would be replaced by Uruguayan Jorge Fossati, who previously led the team from 2003-2004.

Club
Coaching staffKit

|-
|

|

|}

Squad

Transfers

Out
 Andrés Arrunátegui to Independiente del Valle (loan)
 Arlín Ayoví to Deportivo Cuenca
 Joffre Guerrón to Getafe CF
 Christian Lara to Barcelona (loan)
 Jhonaton Monar to Independiente del Valle (loan)
 Cristhian Mora to El Nacional (loan)
 Luis Ortiz to Emelec
 Luis Preti to Universidad Católica
 Ángel Pután to LDU Loja (loan)
 Enrique Vera to Club América

In
 Claudio Bieler from Atlético de Rafaela
 José Francisco Cevallos from Deportivo Azogues (loan)
 Iván Kaviedes* from El Nacional (loan from Norte América)
 Reinaldo Navia from Racing Club
 Néicer Reasco from São Paulo
 Franklin Salas from Red Star Belgrade
 Christian Suárez from Deportivo Azogues
 Edder Vaca from Independiente del Valle (loan from Rocafuerte)
(*) Currently suspended.

Copa Libertadores squad

Copa Sudamericana squad

Club World Cup squad

Competitions

Overall

Serie A

2008 was the club's 47th season in the top-flight national tournament.

First stage

LDU Quito qualified for the Liguilla Final with 2 bonus points.

Second stage
For the second stage, LDU Quito was drawn into Group B.

Aggregate table

Liguilla Final

Results summary

Copa Libertadores

LDU Quito qualified to the 2008 Copa Libertadores as the 2007 Serie A champion. It would be their 13th participation in CONMEBOL's top continental tournament. LDU Quito was drawn into Group 8 with Argentine 2006–07 season 5th place finishers Arsenal de Sarandí, 2007 Copa do Brasil winner Fluminense FC, and Paraguayan Clausura 2007 winner Club Libertad. They were the first team in the tournament to qualify to the knock-out round.

LDU Quito advanced to their first Copa Libertadores finals; they were the second Ecuadorian club to do so (the first being Barcelona). Los Albos won their first Copa Libertadores by penalty shootout after a 5-5 aggregate score at the end of the second leg. Goalkeeper José Francisco Cevallos blocked three penalty kicks to secure the title for his team.

Copa Sudamericana

LDU Quito participated in their 5th Copa Sudamericana. They qualified by finishing first in the second stage of the 2007 Serie A.

FIFA Club World Cup

LDU Quito was the first Ecuadorian club to participate in the FIFA Club World Cup and the first non-Argentine/Brazilian club from CONMEBOL to participate. As the winner of the Copa Libertadores, they received a bye into the semifinals.

Statistics

Top scorer
Season: Claudio Bieler (17 goals)
Serie A: Claudio Bieler (13 goals)
International: Luis Bolaños (7 goals)
Copa Libertadores: Luis Bolaños (5 goals)
Copa Sudamericana: Reinaldo Navia (2 goals)
FIFA Club World Cup: Claudio Bieler & Luis Bolaños (1 goal each)

External links
Official Site 
Olmedo (0) - LDU Quito (3)
LDU Quito (0) - Manchester United (1)

2008
Ldu Quito